Elijah Lim Teck Yong (born 8 May 2001) is a Singaporean professional footballer currently playing as a midfielder for Singapore Premier League side Geylang International.

He was selected for a week-long training stint with the youth academy of J2 League side Matsumoto Yamaga in 2016.

Career statistics

Club

Notes

References

Living people
2001 births
Singaporean footballers
Singaporean sportspeople of Chinese descent
Association football midfielders
Singapore Premier League players